Benjamin Lock (born 4 March 1993) is a Zimbabwean tennis player. He is a member of the Zimbabwe Davis Cup team.

Lock won his first ITF Pro Circuit singles title in Mozambique in 2015. In November 2014, Lock has won his first doubles title on ITF Men's Circuit, playing alongside Jean-Yves Aubone in Niceville, Florida. Lock has won 25 ITF doubles titles.

Lock has represented Zimbabwe at Davis Cup, where he has a win–loss record of 30–12.

Challenger and Futures/World Tennis Tour finals

Singles: 17 (8–9)

Doubles: 64 (35–29)

Davis Cup

Participations: (33–12)

   indicates the outcome of the Davis Cup match followed by the score, date, place of event, the zonal classification and its phase, and the court surface.

References

External links

1993 births
People from Harare
Florida State Seminoles men's tennis players
Living people
Zimbabwean male tennis players
White Zimbabwean sportspeople
Competitors at the 2019 African Games
African Games competitors for Zimbabwe